Dorothy Edith Gilman (June 25, 1923 – February 2, 2012) was an American writer. She is best known for the Mrs. Pollifax series. Begun in a time when women in mystery meant Agatha Christie's Miss Marple and international espionage meant young government men like James Bond and the spies of John le Carré and Graham Greene, Emily Pollifax, her heroine, became a spy in her 60s and is very likely the only spy in literature to belong simultaneously to the CIA and the local garden club.

Biography
Dorothy Gilman was born in New Brunswick, New Jersey, to minister James Bruce and Essa (Starkweather) Gilman. She started writing when she was 9. At 11, she competed against 10- to 16-year-olds in a story contest and won first place. Planning to write and illustrate books for children, she attended Pennsylvania Academy of the Fine Arts 1940–1945. She married teacher Edgar A. Butters, Jr. September 15, 1945; they divorced in 1965. The couple had two children, Christopher and Jonathan. Gilman attended the University of Pennsylvania 1963–1964. She was Unitarian.

Gilman worked as an art teacher and telephone operator before becoming an author. She wrote children's stories for more than ten years under the name Dorothy Gilman Butters and then began writing adult novels about Mrs. Pollifax, a retired grandmother who becomes a CIA agent. The Mrs. Pollifax series made Gilman famous.

Gilman's life is strongly reflected in her writing. She traveled extensively, and her travels became the settings for her Mrs. Pollifax books. In the 1970s, she moved to a property in a small town in Nova Scotia where she grew most of her own vegetables and herbs. This period was the focus of her memoir, A New Kind of Country. Her knowledge of medicinal herbs informed several of her stories, including A Nun in the Closet and Thale's Folly. Thale's Folly is one of her few books featuring a male protagonist; most of her books feature strong women having adventures around the world. In addition to Nova Scotia, Gilman spent much of her life in Connecticut, Maine, and New Mexico.

In 2010 Gilman was awarded the annual Grand Master Award by the Mystery Writers of America.

In 2012, she died at age 88 of complications of Alzheimer's disease.

Works

As Dorothy Gilman Butters
Under her married name, Dorothy Gilman Butters, she wrote books for young adults (except as noted) beginning in the late 1940s: 
 Enchanted Caravan (1949)
 Carnival Gypsy (1950)
 Ragamuffin Alley (1951)
 The Calico Year (1953)
 Four Party Line (1954)
 Papa Dolphin's Table (1955; for children)
 Girl in Buckskin (1956)
 Heartbreak Street (1958)
 Witch's Silver (1959)
 Masquerade (1961)
 Heart's Design (Masquerade Republished) (1963)
 Ten Leagues to Boston Town (1963)
 The Bells of Freedom (1963)

She also contributed to Good Housekeeping, Jack and Jill, Redbook, Ladies' Home Journal, Cosmopolitan, The Writer, and other magazines.

She also contributed a chapter to the book, On Creative Writing, edited by Paul Engle (1964).

The Mrs. Pollifax series 
Gilman began writing under her maiden name for the first book of the Mrs. Pollifax series, The Unexpected Mrs. Pollifax. The heroine, the eccentric Emily Pollifax, is a 60-ish, bored, garden-clubbing grandmother, and widow. Considering her life without real purpose, and after briefly contemplating suicide, she presents herself to the CIA, offering to serve as an agent. Initially recruited through a misunderstanding, she is excited, and a bit clueless about her role, but she quickly adapts to an unfortunate turn of events, and displays the common sense and grit that will guide her through future intrigues.

The series, which ended in 2000 with Mrs. Pollifax Unveiled, consists of fast-paced escapades filled with danger and intrigue in Mexico, Turkey, Thailand, China, Morocco, Zambia, Sicily, and elsewhere.

 The Unexpected Mrs. Pollifax (1966)
 The Amazing Mrs. Pollifax (1970)
 The Elusive Mrs. Pollifax (1971)
 A Palm for Mrs. Pollifax (1973)
 Mrs. Pollifax on Safari (1977)
 Mrs. Pollifax on the China Station (1983)
 Mrs. Pollifax and the Hong Kong Buddha (1985)
 Mrs. Pollifax and the Golden Triangle (1988)
 Mrs. Pollifax and the Whirling Dervish (1990)
 Mrs. Pollifax and the Second Thief (1993)
 Mrs. Pollifax Pursued (1995)
 Mrs. Pollifax and the Lion Killer (1996)
 Mrs. Pollifax, Innocent Tourist (1997)
 Mrs. Pollifax Unveiled (2000)

Other books
Additional books she wrote under the name Dorothy Gilman:
 Uncertain Voyage (1967)
 Clairvoyant Countess (1975)
 A Nun in the Closet (1975), Winner of the Catholic Book Award
 A New Kind of Country (1978) (reissued by Fawcett in 1989); (memoir), memoir of her life in a Nova Scotia village
 The Tightrope Walker (1979)
 The Maze in the Heart of the Castle (1983; for young adults)
 Incident at Badamya (1989)
 Caravan (1992)
 Thale's Folly (1999)
 Kaleidoscope: A Countess Karitska Novel (2002)

Film/TV adaptations
The Unexpected Mrs. Pollifax was filmed by United Artists in 1970 as Mrs. Pollifax-Spy starring Rosalind Russell. Angela Lansbury starred in the made-for-TV movie The Unexpected Mrs. Pollifax in 1999.

References

Sources
Contemporary Authors Online, Gale, 2006. Reproduced in Biography Resource Center. Farmington Hills, Mich.: Thomson Gale Fan website

1923 births
2012 deaths
20th-century American novelists
21st-century American novelists
20th-century American women writers
American children's writers
American spy fiction writers
American women novelists
American Unitarian Universalists
Deaths from Alzheimer's disease
Pennsylvania Academy of the Fine Arts alumni
Writers from New Brunswick, New Jersey
University of Pennsylvania alumni
American women short story writers
Edgar Award winners
People from Rye Brook, New York
American women children's writers
21st-century American women writers
20th-century American short story writers
21st-century American short story writers
Novelists from New Jersey
Deaths from dementia in New York (state)